Hushaar is a 2009 Indian Kannada-language film directed by S Adarsh, starring Adarsh and Mallika Kapoor in lead roles.

Cast

 Adarsha as Vishwas
 Mallika Kapoor as Akshatha
 Master Anand
 Vikram Udaykumar
 Mohan Raj
 Jayasheela

Music

Reception

Critical response 

R G Vijayasarathy of Rediff.com scored the film at 2 out of 5 stars and says "Adarsha has done a better job in the second half as an actor. Mumbai import Mallika Kapoor should be given a crash course in acting immediately. No amount of make-up can cover up an expressionless face. Anand is a good actor, but he is handicapped by uninspiring comedy sequences. Hushaar could have made a greater impact as a suspense thriller if not for the comedy". A critic from The Times of India  scored the film at 2.5 out of 5 stars and wrote "Aadarsha excels as hero and music director. Mallika Kapoor fails to impress. Master Anand's performance as the hero's friend is amateurish. Aadarsha's music is good". A critic from Mid-Day wrote "Aadarsh has done a good job as an actor and director and Mallika charms the audience with her simplistic beauty and acting. Anand*s comedy adds the fun element to the script. Director Aadarsh*s script is praiseworthy, but his cinematography drags like a tele-serial. Thriller and comedy are the highlights of the film. Music is not worth a mention at all and the camerawork needs a lot of improvement. You could watch the movie  once" Manju Shettar from The New Indian Express wrote "Meanwhile, a group of youngsters get killed in peculiar circumstances. The climax is how Viswas succeeds in arresting the culprit behind the killings. Had Adarsha selected a few experienced artistes, the film would have been a lot better".

References

2000s Kannada-language films
2009 films